Geoffrey Boucicaut, was the brother of the illustrious marshal of France Jean le Maingre. He and his army occupied Avignon in 1398 and started a five-year siege of the Palais des Papes where the Avignon Pope Benedict XIII was, which ended when Benedict managed to escape from Avignon on 12 March 1403 and find shelter in territory belonging to Louis II of Anjou.

References
 Anonymous, Le Livre des faits du bon messire Jehan le Maingre, dit Boucicaut. maréschal de France et gouverneur de Jennes
 Lalande, Denis: Jean II le Meingre, dit Boucicaut: (1366 - 1421) - étude d'une biographie héroïque, Genève 1988.
 Châtelet, Albert: L' âge d'or du manuscrit à peintures en France au temps de Charles VI et les heures du Maréchal Boucicaut, Dijon 2000.

Medieval French nobility
Christians of the Barbary Crusade
14th-century French people